A kalaleng is a nose flute made from bamboo from the Philippines.

Usually around two feet in length a kalaleng has holes cut in the side, to be stopped by the fingers producing the notes. The player closes one nostril with a bit of cotton, then forces the air from the other into a small hole cut in the end of the tube. This instrument is found mostly in the northern Philippines and is popular with all the native mountain population of the area. It is a usually decorated with etched patterns. 

The instrument is popular with men and is often used in courting.

References
 The Various Uses of Kawayan (Bamboo) in Filipino Culture by Donna Galicinao
 Music of the Philippines
 Tongali, Lantoy & Kalaleng

External links
 Kalaleng in the collection of the Museum of New Zealand Te Papa Tongarewa

Nose flutes
Philippine musical instruments